Eighth Avenue is a major street in Brooklyn, New York City. It was formerly an enclave for Norwegians and Norwegian-Americans, who have recently become a minority in the area among the current residents, which include new immigrant colonies, among them Chinese and Arabic-speaking peoples. Parts of it have been colloquially re-christened Little Hong Kong in recognition of these newer communities.

It is interrupted by the Green-Wood Cemetery between 20th and 39th Streets, and after traveling nearly  further south through Sunset Park, finally ends at 73rd Street in Bay Ridge.

Lapskaus Boulevard
Lapskaus Boulevard is the nickname of part of Eighth Avenue, in a historically Norwegian working-class section of bordering Bay Ridge, and Sunset Park. In the earlier part of the 20th century, the part of Eighth Avenue in Sunset Park was primarily home to Norwegian immigrants, and it was known as "Little Norway", or Lapskaus Boulevard as the Norwegians termed it. 

The name Lapskaus was derived from a Northern European stew that was a staple food of lower to middle income families. In Norway, lapskaus most often refers to a variation of beef stew. This dish may be called "brun lapskaus" stew made with gravy, "lys lapskaus" stew made with vegetables and  pork meat or "suppelapskaus" where the gravy has been substituted by a light beef stock. While the New York City metropolitan area had a Norwegian presence for more than 300 years, immigration to Bay Ridge began to seriously take shape in the 1920s.

Nordic heritage is still apparent in some sections of the neighborhood. There is an annual Syttende Mai Parade, celebrated in honor of Norwegian Constitution Day. The parade features hundreds of people in folk dress who march along Fifth Avenue. The parade ends with the crowning of Miss Norway near the statue of Leif Ericson. The monument  was donated in 1939 by Crown Prince Olav,  and features a replica of a Viking rune stone located in Tune, Norway. The stone stands on Leif Ericson Square just east of Fourth Avenue.

Chinese community 
In 1983, the first Chinese-American grocery store in Brooklyn, called Choi Yung Grocery, was opened on 5517 Fort Hamilton Parkway Selling both Asian and American products. In 1985, the first Cantonese style seafood restaurant opened on 8th avenue in between 55th and 56th street, called Canton house restaurant. In 1986, Winley Supermarket was opened on the corner of 8th Avenue. These unprecedented supermarkets and restaurants served the predominantly local residents of the area and attracted Chinese immigrants from all areas of Brooklyn. In 1988, the first Chinese Community nonprofit organization opened on Eighth Avenue to serving Sunset Park area Chinese immigrants, called the Brooklyn Chinese American Association (BCA).

Before 1984, there were only about thirty small shops on the entire Eighth Avenue and 90% of the original storefronts on Eighth Avenue in Sunset Park were abandoned. From 1984 to the present, Eighth Avenue has developed from a declining commercial area into a small businesses hub with significant oeconomic development potential.

Transportation
Also serving the avenue along significant portions of its length is the  bus.

See also
 Chinatowns in Brooklyn
 Chinatowns in New York City

References

Further reading
Ringdal, Siv. Lapskaus Boulevard. Norwegian Brooklyn Revisited (Golden Slippers, 2008).
Benardo, Leonard and Weiss, Jennifer. Brooklyn by Name. How the Neighborhoods, Streets, Parks, Bridges, and More Got Their Names (New York University Press, 2006).
Rygg, Andreas Nilsen. Norwegians in New York, 1825—1925 (Brooklyn, N.Y.: Norwegian News Co., 1941).

External links

Lapskaus Boulevard Walking Tour
 Lapskaus Boulevard - A book about the Norwegian colony in Brooklyn
Scandinavian East Coast Museum
  5900 Block of Eighth Avenue

08
History of immigration to the United States
Cultural history of New York City
Culture of Brooklyn
Norwegian migration to North America
Norwegian-American culture in New York (state)
Ethnic enclaves in New York (state)
Chinatowns in New York City